Split Hand Creek is a stream in Itasca County, in the U.S. state of Minnesota.

Split Hand Creek is the English translation of the native Ojibwe-language name; the name has also been translated as "cut hand".

See also
List of rivers of Minnesota

References

Rivers of Itasca County, Minnesota
Rivers of Minnesota